Máximo González and Horacio Zeballos were the defending champions, but did not participate this year.
Paul Capdeville and Marcel Felder won the title, defeating Jorge Aguilar and Daniel Garza 6–7(3–7), 6–4, [10–7].

Seeds

Draw

Draw

External links
Main Draw

Cachantun Cup - Singles
2012 - Doubles